Archibald Donald Lang (April 3, 1948 – March 11, 2021) was a Canadian politician, who represented the electoral district of Porter Creek Centre in the Yukon Legislative Assembly from 2002 to 2011.

Political career

He was a member of the Yukon Party and is Minister of Highways and Public Works and Minister of Community Services.

Lang announced his retirement from the legislature on July 6, 2011.

His twin brother Daniel Lang served in the Senate of Canada from 2009 to 2017. Lang died on March 11, 2021, from cancer at the age of 72.

Electoral record

Yukon general election, 2006

|-

 
|Liberal
|David Laxton
|align="right"|224
|align="right"|30.8%
|align="right"|-9.5%
|-

|NDP
|Kate White
|align="right"|159
|align="right"|21.9%
|align="right"|+13.8%
|- bgcolor="white"
!align="left" colspan=3|Total
!align="right"| 727
!align="right"| 100.0%
!align="right"| –

Yukon general election, 2002

|-

 
|Liberal
|Scott Kent
|align="right"|312
|align="right"|40.3%
|align="right"| –
|-

|NDP
|Judi Johnny
|align="right"|63
|align="right"|8.1%
|align="right"| –
|- bgcolor="white"
!align="left" colspan=3|Total
!align="right"| 774
!align="right"| 100.0%
!align="right"| –

References

Yukon Party MLAs
2021 deaths
Politicians from Whitehorse
21st-century Canadian politicians
1948 births